Netane Masima is a Fiji international rugby league footballer who plays as a  and  for the Western Suburbs Magpies in the Ron Massey Cup.

Background
He is of Fijian and Tongan descent. He represented his Tongan heritage when he played for Tonga at under-20 level in rugby union.

Club career
He previously played for the Guildford Owls in the Ron Massey Cup.

International career
In June 2022 Masima made his international début for the Fiji Bati side against Papua New Guinea.

In October 2022 Masima was named in the Fiji squad for the 2021 Rugby League World Cup.

References

External links
NRL profile
Rakaviti profile
Fiji profile

Living people
Rugby league five-eighths
Rugby league halfbacks
Fiji national rugby league team players
Western Suburbs Magpies players
Year of birth missing (living people)